Thomas Grimsditch (1786 - 1864) was a Conservative Party politician in England.

He was elected at the 1837 general election as one of the two Members of Parliament (MPs) for the borough of Macclesfield, having contested the seat unsuccessfully in 1832 and 1835. He was re-elected in 1841, but was defeated at the 1847 general election and did not stand for Parliament again.

References

External links 

1786 births
Conservative Party (UK) MPs for English constituencies
UK MPs 1837–1841
UK MPs 1841–1847
1864 deaths